In his late career in the 1650s, the Dutch artist Rembrandt created drawings that were inspired by miniatures from Mughal India. This was the only time the artist engaged with the artistic style of a "dramatically foreign culture". They depict Mughal emperors, noblemen, courtiers, and sometimes women and common folk. They were executed on expensive Asian or Japanese paper, and only 23 drawings survive today.

The early-1600s witnessed a growth in trade between Mughal India and the Dutch East India Company, and many artists, including Rembrandt, were exposed to Indian objects and works of art for the first time. Rembrandt's Mughal drawings were a result of this cultural exchange that occurred due to global trade.

The drawings are not strictly copies of Mughal paintings, and it is not known whether they were intended for personal use or were commissions. This departure in his oeuvre has been interpreted as Rembrandt's way of reinventing himself as an artist during a low point in his late career, when he faced bankruptcy. In 2005, Dr. Marian Bisanz-Prakken of Albertina wrote: "It is supposed that Rembrandt's creative examination of the Mughal miniatures may have exerted some influence on the pen and wash style of his late drawings."

History and context
Once the Dutch East India Company was established in 1602, Amsterdam witnessed the growth of an international market where goods from across the world were traded. Rembrandt benefitted from this global exposure that enabled him to buy "drawings and prints from the principal masters of the whole world". His inventory included Chinese, Turkish and Mughal Indian artefacts. The latter was the inspiration for his late-career Mughal drawings, which marked a significant departure from his usual style and subjects.

In 1656, following Rembrandt's bankruptcy, an inventory of his possessions showed that he owned an album of "curious miniature drawings", which are believed to be Indian Mughal miniatures. Stephanie Schrader, who curated Rembrandt and the Inspiration of India and has extensively studied the drawings, states that Rembrandt's creation of these drawings at this low point in his career could have been a way of re-establishing himself as an artist who is aware of prevailing international styles.

The first public record comes from a 1747 sale catalogue of Jonathan Richardson that states: "A book of Indian Drawings, by Rembrandt, 25 in number." Rembrandt is believed to have made many drawings after contemporary Indian paintings and miniatures, but only 23 survive today. The exact sources for the drawings are not known. Whether these were commissioned or meant for personal use is not verifiable either.

Style and technique
Rembrandt's drawings were not strict imitations of Mughal works. Although Indian miniatures were executed in rich colours, Rembrandt's drawings take a more restrained approach, focusing more on the shape of the figures and their "exotic" facial features and attire. He also introduced perspective and shading, elements not found in Mughal miniatures. Unlike the miniatures, which were often in profile, the drawings convey a sense of movement and make apparent the distribution of body weight.

While most of the drawings depict Indian royalty or noblemen, a few represent the common people or women. All drawings are made on 'Asian paper', which was then imported by the Dutch East India Company and highly prized. Rembrandt's use of expensive paper has been interpreted as him holding the subject matter in high regard.

List of 23 extant drawings

Notes
The information on the extant drawings are sourced from the exhibition catalogue of Rembrandt and the Inspiration of India, J. Paul Getty Museum.

Bibliography

 

Rembrandt
Drawings by Rembrandt
Mughal art